Dwain Murphy is a Dominican-born Canadian actor. He is best known for playing Eric in Degrassi: The Next Generation, Giles in  The Line, and Bishop in How She Move. Murphy has made an appearance in Tom Clancy's Splinter Cell: Blacklist doing the voice and physical performance of Isaac Briggs.

Biography
Murphy was born on the Caribbean island of Dominica. After coming to Canada with his parents at the age of four, Murphy was persuaded to start acting and graduated from the Humber College Acting for Film and Television program. He is known for playing the character Bishop in How She Move, and a supporting role as Flipper in Poor Boy's Game. He also works in television and is known for his recurring role as Eric, Marco Del Rossi's boyfriend, in Degrassi: The Next Generation, and for playing Giles, Carlos's brother in The Line. He also had a starring role in the film Saving God as Norris.

Murphy currently resides in Toronto, Ontario. He also has a love for basketball. He is a Catholic.

Filmography

References

External links

Year of birth missing (living people)
Living people
Canadian male film actors
Canadian male television actors
Dominica actors
Dominica emigrants to Canada
Black Canadian male actors
Canadian male voice actors